Kuei-juet is a  boma in  Jalle payam, Bor North County, Jonglei State, South Sudan, about 60 kilometers northeast of Bor.

Demographics
According to the Fifth Population and Housing Census of Sudan, conducted in April 2008, Kuei-juet  boma had a population of 1,919 people, composed of 1,005 male and 914 female residents.

Notes

References 

Populated places in Jonglei State